Naoko Watanabe may refer to:

 Naoko Watanabe (actress) (born 1984), Japanese actress who appeared in Silk
 Naoko Watanabe (voice actress) (born 1959), Japanese voice actress known for her work in the Dragon Ball series